Duncolm (Scottish Gaelic: Dùn Choluim) is a hill in Scotland. Its name means "Fort of Columba".

It lies near Loch Humphrey.  There is an easy path to the summit from the south-west, which passes over two subsidiary peaks, Little Duncolm and Middle Duncolm.

External links 
short article

References 

Marilyns of Scotland
Mountains and hills of West Dunbartonshire